Ken Kelley may refer to:

 Ken Kelley (journalist) (1949–2008), American journalist and publisher
 Ken Kelley (American football) (born 1960), American linebacker

See also
 Ken Kelly (disambiguation)